Campo nell'Elba is a comune (municipality) on the island of Elba, in the Province of Livorno in the Italian region of Tuscany, located about  southwest of Florence and about  south of Livorno.

See also
Monte Capanne
Marina di Campo Airport
Monte Poro Lighthouse

References

External links
 Official website

Cities and towns in Tuscany
Elba
 
Populated coastal places in Italy